Olivier Bourdeaut (born 1980 in Nantes, Loire-Atlantique) is a French contemporary writer.

Biography 
Olivier Bourdeaut was a real estate agent in Nantes when the loss of his work led him to devote himself to literature. He worked for two years writing a first novel, dark, which however found no publisher. While residing with his parents in Spain he devoted himself to the writing, in seven weeks, of another light and wacky novel that would become En attendant Bojangles. Published by éditions Finitude, the first to acquire its rights, the book received the enthusiastic support of Jérôme Garcin in Le Nouvel Observateur, and immediately met an enormous success with the public.

Work 
2016: 
2019: 
2018: 
2021:

References

External links 
 Oliver Bourdeaut on Babelio
 Olivier Bourdeaut, ou la revanche d'un "loser" magnifique on L'Express (28 March 216)
 Qui est Olivier Bourdeaut auteur du roman "En attendant Bojangles" ? on Marie-Claire (25 May 2016)
 Entretien avec Olivier Bourdeaut, En attendant Bojangles on Lecthot (19 April 2016)

21st-century French non-fiction writers
Prix Emmanuel Roblès recipients
1980 births
Writers from Nantes
Living people